Stokes Creek is a  long 3rd order tributary to Lawsons Creek in Halifax County, Virginia.

Course 
Stokes Creek rises about 1.5 miles west-southwest of Cluster Springs, Virginia, and then flows northeast and turns northwest to join Lawsons Creek about 0.5 miles southwest of Riverdale.

Watershed 
Stokes Creek drains  of area, receives about 45.7 in/year of precipitation, has a wetness index of 436.45, and is about 45% forested.

See also 
 List of Virginia Rivers

References

Watershed Maps 

Rivers of Virginia
Rivers of Halifax County, Virginia
Tributaries of the Roanoke River